Ville-sous-la-Ferté is a commune in the Aube department in the Grand Est region in north-central France.

The best-known landmark of Ville-sous-la-Ferté is the nearby ruin of Clairvaux Abbey, now the site of Clairvaux Prison.

Population

See also
Communes of the Aube department

References

External links

 Columbia Encyclopedia entry

Communes of Aube
Aube communes articles needing translation from French Wikipedia
Ville-sous-la-Ferté